The Canton of Montivilliers is a former canton situated in the Seine-Maritime département and in the Haute-Normandie region of northern France. It was disbanded following the French canton reorganisation which came into effect in March 2015. It had a total of 35,156 inhabitants (2012).

Geography 
An area of farming and light industry in the arrondissement of Le Havre, centred on the town of Montivilliers. The altitude varies from 0m (Cauville-sur-Mer) to 118m (Manéglise) with an average altitude of 55m.

The canton comprised 11 communes:

Cauville-sur-Mer
Épouville
Fontaine-la-Mallet
Fontenay
Manéglise
Mannevillette
Montivilliers
Notre-Dame-du-Bec
Octeville-sur-Mer
Rolleville
Saint-Martin-du-Manoir

Population

See also 
 Arrondissements of the Seine-Maritime department
 Cantons of the Seine-Maritime department
 Communes of the Seine-Maritime department

References

Montivilliers
2015 disestablishments in France
States and territories disestablished in 2015